This is a list of missing ships and wrecks. If it is known that the ship in question sank, then its wreck has not yet been located.

Ships are usually declared lost and assumed wrecked after a period of disappearance. The disappearance of a ship usually implies all hands lost. Without witnesses or survivors, the mystery surrounding the fate of missing ships has inspired many items of nautical lores and the creation of paranormal zones such as the Bermuda Triangle. In many cases a probable cause has been deduced, such as a known storm or warfare, but it could not be confirmed without witnesses or sufficient documentation.

Many disappearances occurred before wireless telegraphy became available in navigation applications in the late 1890s, which would have allowed crew to send a distress call. Sudden disasters such as military strike, collision, rogue wave, or piracy could also prevent a crew from sending a distress call and reporting a location.

Among the many missing ships on the list are submarines, which have limited communication, and provide the crew almost no chance of survival if struck by disaster under water.

The advancement of radar technology by the end of World War II and today's Global Positioning System make it more likely that a distressed vessel will be located.

Most vessels currently listed as missing disappeared over a vast search area and/or deep water and there is little commercial interest in searching for the vessels and salvaging the wreck and its contents. Often the search and recovery costs are prohibitive even with today's sonar and wrecking technologies and could not be compensated by salvaged valuables, even if there were any on board. The search for these types of missing vessels is usually motivated by historical, legal or actuarial interests requiring the aid of government funding such as in the 2008 discovery of HMAS Sydney and Kormoran.

The list is organised by the marine region in which the disappearance or sinking occurred, or the closest country to the area. The year of the disappearance, last known location, and possible location of the wreck are included.

Africa

North America

Central America

Asia

Europe

Oceania

High seas
The following lists contain entries that could not be referenced to an area close to any one particular country or an area definitely in international waters.

See also
 Lists of shipwrecks
 List of unrecovered and unusable flight recorders
 List of ghost ships

References

missing
Missing
ships